The term Austro-Turkish War may refer to:

 Austro-Turkish War (1593–1606)
 Austro-Turkish War (1663–1664)
 Austro-Turkish War (1683–1699)
 Austro-Turkish War (1716–1718)
 Austro-Turkish War (1737–1739)
 Austro-Turkish War (1788–1791)
 Austro-Hungarian campaign in Bosnia and Herzegovina in 1878

See also
 Ottoman wars in Europe
 Ottoman–Habsburg wars in Hungary (1526–1568)
 Habsburg-Ottoman War (disambiguation)
 Great War (disambiguation)